The Samaná hutia (Plagiodontia ipnaeum) is an extinct species of rodent in the subfamily Capromyinae. It was endemic to Hispaniola (the Dominican Republic and Haiti). Its natural habitat was subtropical or tropical moist lowland forests.

History
The remains were found in association with those from rats of the genus Rattus, which suggests that the imposter hutia survived until the time of European colonization of the island, and may have gone extinct due to predation from introduced rodents. It is possible that the Samaná hutia represents the quemi, an animal purported to inhabit Hispaniola by Spanish colonist Gonzalo Fernández de Oviedo y Valdés from 1536 to 1546; it could also represent an animal called comadreja, which allegedly survived into the 20th century.

References

Plagiodontia
Extinct animals of Haiti
Extinct animals of the Dominican Republic
Mammals of Hispaniola
Mammals of the Dominican Republic
Mammals of Haiti
Mammals of the Caribbean
Mammals described in 1948
Rodent extinctions since 1500
Taxonomy articles created by Polbot